XS1 may refer to:
 The original designation, XS-1, of the Bell X-1, a supersonic prototype airplane designed and built by the United States in 1945
 XS-1 (spacecraft), a DARPA experimental spaceplane
 Fujifilm X-S1, a superzoom digital bridge camera released in November 2011
 XCore XS1 microprocessor